42–44 Sackville Street, known originally as Sackville House with originally two separate entrances, 42 and 44 Sackville Street, is a four-storey over basement Grade II listed building in Manchester, England. It is situated in the City Centre ward, and is delimited by Sackville Street to the East, the Rochdale Canal and Canal Street to the North, and Brazil Street to the South. It is adjoined on the West side by Amazon House, and faces Sackville Gardens.

It was built during the expansion of the city, after the Rochdale Canal was opened in 1804, which it is alongside. Its purpose was rental by several company offices.

It is the first Manchester 19th-century warehouse to have been converted into New York-style residential loft apartments in the 20th century.

Style
It was designed in 1870 by Pennington and Brigden, architects and surveyors, of Essex Chambers, 8 Essex Street, Manchester M2 (at the crossing with King Street), in a rectangular and symmetrical late Georgian style, and made of brick and sandstone. Twin front doors each have a Roman head keystone, probably of Janus, the god of doorways.

Unlike many other buildings of the time, it did not have its name or the date of construction featuring on the building itself.

There was a goods entry on the South side and metal tracks leading into the building, where the car park entrance now is. The ground floor had hoists for lifting and moving goods, some of which still remain. Goods could be brought and collected by barge on the Rochdale Canal.

It is not known who owned the building and how funds were raised to build it.

Chronology of uses, occupiers and ownership

Nature of businesses
The street index archives at Manchester Central Library show the building being occupied from 1876.

By 1969, 153 firms had been in the building, for periods ranging from one year to the longest standing company, Greatorex & Co. Ltd., present for 94 years from 1876 and still there in 1969, with an ongoing Companies House listing as Greatorex (Manchester) Ltd after that. The second longest standing company was there for 46 years, Pickering and Berthoud. For the first 10 years, there were typically six companies in the building, then 10 until 1932 onwards when the norm was 15.

The companies mostly named after their owner, show origins in countries including Greece, Turkey, Armenia, Portugal, Germany, Italy, with several names of Jewish descent. Markets served were specific by company, including the Levant, Constantinople, India, the United States, and normally the one from which the head of the firm was from.

Looking at the variations in the names of the businesses, it is possible to see how they included or were handed over to sons, partners appeared and disappeared or took over, and new branches were started so as to diversify.

Although the great majority of firms were connected to the textile industry, exceptions included the Portuguese Vice-Consulate from 1896 to 1922, and in later years the North West Arts Association. Possibly the most famous company name is the Singer sewing machine company.

Table of businesses, and dates up to 1969 (ordered by start date of occupancy)
Note: Archive records show data by address up to 1969 only, making later data compiling very difficult.

* Records were not published each year so start and end dates are subject to this.

In the 1960s, the building was bought by Sunderland Investments Ltd., led by businessman Oussama Lababedi.

The building was Grade II listed in October 1974.

Redevelopment
From 1983, the building then came under the area regeneration efforts of the Manchester Phoenix Initiative.

In 1988, planning permission was granted to change use of the building from offices to a hotel. This was not implemented.

In 1991, the Central Manchester Development Corporation bought the building for £1 million plus £34,000 transaction costs. Following this, the businesses left the building in readiness for redevelopment.

The Manhattan Loft Corporation won approval in 1994 to convert the building into apartments. An artists' residence under their aegis and referring to the building as the 'Manhattan Loft Building' took place in it from October to November 1994. A marketing booklet was produced, and living space put for sale. They eventually abandoned the project however.

Artisan Regeneration led by Carol Ainscow, obtained approval in 1995 to convert the building into apartments, with purchase rights from the CMDC once the work completed. On 31 December 1995, the basement and ground floors were used for a New Year's Eve party.

The conversion work was done in 1996, to a design by the Pozzoni Design Group. The building was converted into 29 loft apartments with 11 parking spaces in its basement, retaining many of the original interior features such as wooden beams, cast iron pillars, industrial iron features, fireplaces, exposed brick walls, and high ceilings; most of the rooftop chimneys were removed; a 4th floor with vaulted ceilings was created in the previous roof space. Apartments were bought from mid 1996.

The freehold has been owned since 2009 by the 42–44 Sackville Street RTM Company Ltd, of which the members are among the owners of the apartments.

Filmography
The building has been regularly featured in shoots for film and TV, including: 
 This Life (BBC, 1996) 
 Cold Feet (ITV)
 Queer as Folk (Channel 4, 1999)
 Sinchronicity (BBC 3, 2006)
 The Good Housekeeping Guide (BBC, 2006)
 Kellogg's advert for Make Time for Breakfast/National Breakfast Week (2011)
 Cucumber (Red Productions for Channel 4, 2015)
 Genius (Summit Entertainment, 2016) starring Nicole Kidman, Laura Linney, Colin Firth and Jude Law

Former residents
 Simon Nicks a.k.a. Nicksy (deceased) Key 103 / Galaxy Radio Radio DJ
 Martin Hancock, actor, a.k.a. 'Spider' in Coronation Street (ITV)
 Beverley Callard, Coronation Street actress (ITV)
 Damian Lewis OBE, actor
 Carol Ainscow (deceased), Director of building developer Artisan Holdings
 Peter Dalton, Director of building developer Artisan Holdings
 AJ LeRoy, singer
 Belinda Scandal, drag queen

Further sources of information
 Manchester Library General website: http://www.manchester.gov.uk/info/448/archives_and_local_history
 Manchester Library Booking for archives/special collections: www.manchester.gov.uk/libraries
 Archives Catalogue: www.gmlives.org.uk
 Local Images Collection: www.images.manchester.gov.uk
 Images including Canal Street http://images.manchester.gov.uk/ResultsList.php?session=pass&QueryName=BasicQuery&QueryPage=%2Findex.php%3Fsession%3Dpass&Anywhere=SummaryData%7CAdmWebMetadata&QueryTerms=canal+street&QueryOption=Anywhere&StartAt=321
 Images including Sackville Street: http://images.manchester.gov.uk/ResultsList.php?session=pass&QueryName=BasicQuery&QueryPage=%2Findex.php%3Fsession%3Dpass&Anywhere=SummaryData%7CAdmWebMetadata&QueryTerms=sackville+street&QueryOption=Anywhere&StartAt=321
 Archives+: www.archivesplus.org
 Flickr: www.flickr.com/photos/manchesterarchiveplus

References 

Grade II listed buildings in Manchester
Residential buildings in Manchester